Balanerodus is an extinct monospecific genus of alligatorid crocodylian. Fossils have been found from the Fitzcarrald Arch in the Peruvian Amazon and the La Victoria Formation of the Honda Group in Colombia and date back to the Friasian and Laventan regional South American land mammal ages of the Middle Miocene.

Description
It was an atypical crocodilian with mysterious acorn-like teeth and co-existed with many other crocodilians, which were more diverse at the time period than they are today, including terrestrial predatory sebecid Langstonia, the massive Purussaurus, and flat headed duck-like Mourasuchus. Its teeth and the diversity of crocodilians suggest it occupied a different niche than they did. Another animal with acorn-like teeth is the Vaquita.

References 

Alligatoridae
Miocene crocodylomorphs
Miocene reptiles of South America
Friasian
Colloncuran
Laventan
Neogene Colombia
Fossils of Colombia
Honda Group, Colombia
Neogene Peru
Fossils of Peru
Fossil taxa described in 1965
Prehistoric pseudosuchian genera